Power of 10 is an international Sony Pictures Television game show format featuring contestants predicting how a cross-section of local people from the host broadcaster's country responded to questions covering a wide variety of topics in polls conducted by the broadcaster and production company.

Broadcast history
The US version ran from August 7, 2007, to January 23, 2008, originally as a summer series and later as a replacement program on CBS, hosted by Drew Carey. It aired twice weekly during the late summer and early fall. Each game featured contestants predicting how a cross-section of Americans responded to questions covering a wide variety of topics in polls conducted by CBS. The top prize was an annuitized $10,000,000.

The series was produced by Embassy Row Productions in association with Sony Pictures Television and was taped at Kaufman Astoria Studios in New York City.

On September 10, 2007, CBS ordered six additional episodes of the show slated for mid-season to extend the first season to 18 episodes. The summer finale aired on September 23, 2007, due to Kid Nation airing the following Wednesday.

The show returned on January 2, 2008, airing on Wednesday nights, competing with the most-watched show in the United States at the time, Fox's American Idol. However, on January 24, 2008, it was reported that CBS removed the show from the schedule after four episodes due to low ratings, with a possible return in the summer. This summer run never materialized, and by April 30, 2008, the show had been canceled in favor of The Price Is Right $1,000,000 Spectacular, also hosted by Carey. 
Power of 10 was not included in CBS's 2008–09 schedule on May 13, 2008, confirming its cancellation.

GSN picked up the rights to Power of 10 episodes in March 2011. The episodes began to air weekdays at 5:00p.m. ET in order to promote Drew Carey's upcoming Improv series, which did not show much success. Power of 10 was eventually moved to weekends, and was replaced by Deal or No Deal in March 2012.

Rules and gameplay
Two contestants attempt to predict the results of polls in a best-of-five elimination round. A question is read (e.g., "What percentage of Americans said they are afraid of circus clowns?") and the two contestants are given ten seconds to lock in their guess using a dial to select a percentage. If a contestant has not locked in their guess after ten seconds, the computer locks in the percentage on which the contestant's dial rests. The player who comes closest to the actual percentage earns a point. The first player to earn three points advances to the money round to play for the top prize.

In the money round, the contestant is given similar questions, and specifies a range of values on a scale from 0% to 100% that they believe includes each correct answer. The size of the range decreases with each question as cash awards increase:

For the first three questions, the correct answer to the question is revealed once the contestant locks in an answer by pulling down a handle or lever. For the $1,000,000 question, the correct answer is only revealed if the actual percentage is outside of the contestant's range. If the contestant correctly answers the $1,000,000 question, they are then given the chance to win $10,000,000 by picking the exact percentage (rounded to the nearest percent) out of that 10% range.

Missing a question ends the game. Contestants who miss either the $1,000 or $10,000 question leave empty-handed. From the $100,000 question onward, missing a question decreases the contestant's winnings "by the power of 10", meaning that he/she leaves with 10% of the money accumulated to that point.

For each question, audience members make exact-percentage guesses in order to show the contestant a full sample of the results for help in answering. Contestants can also ask an in-studio relative or friend to give an opinion before locking in an answer; contestants can also adjust their choice, if necessary, to elicit reactions from the audience or their friend/relative. Contestants can stop the game and take the money that they currently have at any time before locking in an answer.

Unlike most other game shows, the host is not made aware of the correct answers ahead of time, so Carey may help contestants think through questions and offer his own opinions about possible answers.

Notable US contestants
Jamie Sadler, a 19-year-old Upper Montclair, New Jersey pre-med student at the University of Florida, was the first contestant to earn the right to play for money on the game show, and won $1,000,000 (to be paid as a ten-year annuity). This made him the youngest person to ever win $1 million on a quiz show or game show (the second youngest was David Goodman on Who Wants to Be a Millionaire). Sadler accomplished this distinction by giving a range of 23% to 33% for the question, "What percentage of women consider themselves feminists?" Though given the chance to win the $10,000,000 grand prize, he declined to lock in a guess for the exact percentage within that range. Instead, he quit the game, and kept his $1 million prize. Subsequently, with no risk involved, he informally guessed 24%. The correct answer was 29%. This marks the first time CBS has ever awarded a $1 million prize on a studio game show (as opposed to the network's reality game shows like Survivor and The Amazing Race), and marks the first time an American game show has given away a million dollars to the very first contestant on its first episode (this record would be broken nine years later when a married couple won $1,300,010 on the first episode of The Wall). On the show, Carey claimed that neither he nor the show's producers believed anyone would reach the $10,000,000 question so early in the show's run. As a result, Carey claimed that they were unprepared for its actual occurrence, but that he would "wing it".

Big Brother 8 contestants Daniele Donato and Amber Siyavus won the opportunity to appear on the show following a Power of Veto Challenge on Big Brother. The pair were taken out of the house to compete and returned to the house following filming. Amber won in the opening round and made it to the $100,000 question, but answered incorrectly and left with $1,000.

Contestant Matt Hoffman, who later went on compete on Big Brother 12, didn't make it past the first round.

On the episode that aired on January 2, 2008, two contestants that made it to the money round and each won nothing in the same episode for the first time.

International versions

Awards and nominations
Power of 10 won the Best Game Show prize at the 2008 Rose d'Or ceremony.

References

External links
Official CBS Power of 10  site
Official Sony Pictures Power of 10 site
Press release announcing summer pick-up of Power of 10
 

2007 American television series debuts
2008 American television series endings
CBS original programming
2000s American game shows
Television series by Embassy Row (production company)
Television series by Sony Pictures Television
Television shows filmed in New York City